Simone Venier (born 26 August 1984, in Latina) is an Italian rower - a five time Olympian. He won a silver medal in the men's quadruple sculls at the 2008 Summer Olympics. He competed at the 2020 Summer Olympics, in Quadruple sculls.

The Olympic rower Annibale Venier is his father.

References

External links
 

1984 births
Living people
Italian male rowers
Olympic rowers of Italy
Rowers at the 2004 Summer Olympics
Rowers at the 2008 Summer Olympics
Rowers at the 2012 Summer Olympics
Rowers at the 2016 Summer Olympics
Rowers at the 2020 Summer Olympics
Olympic silver medalists for Italy
Olympic medalists in rowing
Medalists at the 2008 Summer Olympics
Rowers of Fiamme Gialle
European Rowing Championships medalists